Leonel Efraín Cota Montaño (born 23 April 1958, in Santiago) is a Mexican politician. He is a former governor of Baja California Sur and former president of the Party of the Democratic Revolution (PRD). He was the first non-PRI governor of Baja California Sur.

Leonel Cota studied political science at the National Autonomous University of Mexico. He began his political career as a member of the Institutional Revolutionary Party (PRI), which he represented in the Chamber of Deputies from 1994 to 1996 and as municipal president of La Paz, from 1997 to 1999.

In 1999 he lost the PRI candidacy for governor of Baja California Sur. He quit the PRI and instead ran for governor representing a coalition of the Party of the Democratic Revolution and the Labor Party (PT). He won the election and served as governor from 1999 to 2005.

In 2005 Cota became president of the PRD with over 76% of the vote.

He would later shift to Nueva Alianza in a failed bid for the Municipal Presidency of Los Cabos. He would then revert to PRD, for the 2012 general elections, looking for a Senate seat. This makes PAN the only major Mexican political party to which he has not belonged.

External links
  La Jornada: Leonel Cota, virtual presidente del PRD

1958 births
Living people
Governors of Baja California Sur
Politicians from Baja California Sur
Members of the Chamber of Deputies (Mexico)
Presidents of the Party of the Democratic Revolution
National Autonomous University of Mexico alumni
People from Los Cabos Municipality
Institutional Revolutionary Party politicians
Municipal presidents in Baja California Sur